Merulempista cingillella is a moth of the family Pyralidae. It is known from China (Hebei, Inner Mongolia, Qinghai, Ningxia, Tianjin, Xinjiang), Albania, Austria, Bosnia and Herzegovina, Croatia, France, Germany, Hungary, Italy, Russia, Slovakia, Spain, Switzerland, Turkey, Ukraine and Morocco.

The larvae feed on Myricaria germanica, Tamarix gracilis and other Tamarix species

External links
Review of the genus Merulempista Roesler, 1967 (Lepidoptera, Pyralidae) from China, with description of two new species

Moths described in 1846
Phycitini
Moths of Europe
Moths of Asia